José Raúl Aveiro Lamas (born 18 July 1936) is a Paraguayan former professional footballer who played as a striker.

Career
Born in Asunción, Aveiro played for Sportivo Luqueño, Valencia, Valencia Mestalla, Elche, Ontinyent and Constància.

He was also a member of the Paraguay national team between 1957 and 1959.

References

1936 births
Living people
Sportspeople from Asunción
Paraguayan footballers
Paraguay international footballers
Sportivo Luqueño players
Valencia CF players
Valencia CF Mestalla footballers
Elche CF players
Ontinyent CF players
CE Constància players
La Liga players
Segunda División players
Segunda División B players
Association football forwards
Paraguayan expatriate footballers
Paraguayan expatriate sportspeople in Spain
Expatriate footballers in Spain
1958 FIFA World Cup players